The Oliver Blood House is a historic house in Hamilton, Montana. It was built in 1902 for Vinum Oliver Blood, a rancher. Blood was born in Illinois in 1860 and he became a bee-keeper for copper baron Marcus Daly. He was a member of the Hamilton Odd Fellows Lodge, and he died in 1941.

The house was designed in the Colonial Revival and Queen Anne architectural styles. It has been listed on the National Register of Historic Places since August 26, 1988.

References

National Register of Historic Places in Ravalli County, Montana
Queen Anne architecture in Montana
Colonial Revival architecture in Montana
Houses completed in 1902
Houses on the National Register of Historic Places in Montana
Hamilton, Montana
Houses in Ravalli County, Montana